Entheus priassus is a species of skipper butterfly found in Central and South America. It is a specialist herbivore on the leaves of Gustavia superba (Lecythidaceae).

Subspecies
Entheus priassus priassus (Surinam, French Guiana)
Entheus priassus pralina Evans, 1952 (Brazil (Espírito Santo))

References

Hesperiidae
Hesperiidae of South America
Fauna of Brazil
Lepidoptera of French Guiana
Fauna of Suriname
Butterflies described in 1758
Taxa named by Carl Linnaeus